Gonzalo Iván Largo Romero (born 1 August 1977 in Madrid) is a 5-a-side football player from Spain. He is blind. He played 5-a-side football at the 2004 Summer Paralympics.  His team finished third after they played Greece and, won 2–0.

References

External links 
 
 

1977 births
Living people
Paralympic 5-a-side footballers of Spain
Paralympic bronze medalists for Spain
Paralympic medalists in football 5-a-side
5-a-side footballers at the 2004 Summer Paralympics
Medalists at the 2004 Summer Paralympics
Sportspeople from Madrid